The rock skink (Flexiseps decaryi) is a species of skink endemic to Madagascar.

References

Reptiles of Madagascar
Reptiles described in 1930
Flexiseps
Taxa named by Fernand Angel